Khivan campaign of 1839
 Khivan campaign of 1873